The London Post Office Railway 1930 Stock and 1936 Stock was built by English Electric. These units comprised the bulk of the fleet from the 1930s until the introduction of the 1980 Stock. The articulated units were designed to replace the earlier unsuccessful 1927 Stock, which were prone to derailments.

An initial 50 units were ordered, being built in two batches from 1930–1931. They reused electrical equipment from withdrawn 1927 Stock units. Due to an increase in traffic levels, ten further units were built in 1936. The numbering details of units is shown in the table below:

After the introduction of the 1980 Stock, some units were retained, being renumbered into the range 35–51 in 1984. All remaining units were withdrawn in 2003 when the system closed.

Several units have been preserved, most of which are from the second batch of 1930 Stock. These are listed below:
760 (later 37) - Beeches Light Railway
761 (later 38) - Launceston Steam Railway
803 – Buckinghamshire Railway Centre
806 (later 42) - Launceston Steam Railway
807 – The British Postal Museum & Archive's Museum Store (previously in the Science Museum, London)
808 – Amberley Working Museum
809 – National Railway Museum

 1930